Oxford School may refer to:

 Oxford Franciscan school, 12th century philosophical movement that include Robert Grosseteste, Roger Bacon, Duns Scotus and William of Ockham
 Ecole Oxford School,Dubai,
 Oxford Community School, England, United Kingdom
 Oxford Spires Academy, England, United Kingdom
 Oxford Schools, Amman, Jordan
 Oxford School (Rowland Heights, California)
 The Oxford School, Panama City, Panama

See also
 University of Oxford, England, United Kingdom
 Oxford College (disambiguation)
 Oxford High School (disambiguation)
 Oxford Academy (disambiguation)
 Oxford University (disambiguation)